Harutaeographa maria is a moth of the family Noctuidae. It is found in Pakistan (Jammu, Kashmir and Karakorum).

References

Moths described in 1999
Orthosiini